Alexander MacFarlane (1878 – 22 December 1945) was a Scottish professional football player and manager. As a player, he won the Scottish Cup with Dundee in 1910. As a manager, he won the Third Division South with Charlton Athletic in 1929.

Playing career

MacFarlane first played in Scotland for Airdrieonians before moving south to join Woolwich Arsenal in 1896. He only made seven appearances for Arsenal, his debut coming against Grimsby Town on 28 November 1896, and returned to Airdrie the following year. His second move south of the border was more successful, joining Newcastle and becoming their first-choice inside-left. In three seasons in the north-east, MacFarlane made eighty-four First Division appearances, scoring seventeen goals in three consecutive top six finishes, as well as two FA Cup appearances.

He returned to Scotland to play for Dundee in 1901. During his twelve years there, he won a Scottish Cup in 1909–10 and made five appearances for Scotland between 1904 and 1911, scoring once in a 5–0 victory over Ireland on 15 March 1909 in the British Home Championship. He moved to Chelsea in 1913, but only played sporadically and retired from playing in 1914.

Managerial career
MacFarlane returned to Dundee in 1919 and spent six years in charge of the club, during which time they reached another Scottish Cup final in 1924–25. That summer, Charlton Athletic tempted him to move south. In January 1928 he returned to Dundee, but only lasted seven months before returning to Charlton. In his first full season back at the club, he led Charlton to the 1928–29 Third Division South title.

He ledt Charlton in 1932 and a year later joined Blackpool on a two-year contract. At Blackpool, he dismantled the Seasiders squad, allowing nine players to leave Bloomfield Road as he brought in fresh faces. One player he signed, Peter Doherty, cost £1,000 but was sold on to Manchester City in 1936 for ten times that amount. At the end of the 1934–35 season, Blackpool sat in fourth position in the Division Two table, just missing out on a return to the top flight.

Blackpool was MacFarlane's last appointment, and he drifted out of football at the age of 57. He died in Preston, Lancashire, in December 1945.

Honours

As a player
Dundee
Scottish Cup: 1910

As manager
Charlton Athletic
Third Division South: 1929

Individual
Dundee FC Heritage Award: 2015
Dundee FC Hall of Fame: 2015

References

External links
Photo of Dundee F.C. Scottish Cup winning team of 1910

Scottish footballers
Scotland international footballers
Scottish Football League players
Airdrieonians F.C. (1878) players
Arsenal F.C. players
Newcastle United F.C. players
Dundee F.C. players
Chelsea F.C. players
Dundee F.C. managers
Charlton Athletic F.C. managers
Blackpool F.C. managers
1878 births
1945 deaths
Scottish Football League representative players
Footballers from Airdrie, North Lanarkshire
Scottish Football League managers
Association football inside forwards
Date of birth missing
Scottish football managers